PM2FAW (93.2 FM), broadcasts as Hot 93.2 FM or Hot FM, is a radio station in Jakarta, Indonesia. It broadcasts dangdut music, along with a few Melayu pop songs.

History 
Before 93.2 FM was acquired by Mahaka, it was occupied by MD Radio. MD Radio was the successor of Suara Kejayaan (SK/Sentra Komedi) that was forced to move from 101.6 FM to 93.2 FM at that time. 
MD Radio broadcast in contemporary hit radio format like Gen 98.7 FM. MD Radio ceased broadcast in April 2014 and reported to be leased. But MD Radio kept playing non-stop music until early 2016. 
Mahaka started test broadcast of Hot FM in September 2016, using "Radio 93.2 FM" or "93.2 FM" branding. Dangdut music starts playing at that time, until today. In October, some DJs were reported to fill on-air slots.

References 

Radio stations in Jakarta